Bagaregården is a district in Gothenburg, Sweden, which belongs to Örgryte borough.

Most parts of the district were designed by town planner Albert Lilienberg. He was inspired by the Austrian architect Camillo Sitte. There are many Landshövdingehus in the area.

The term "bagaregård" (the indefinite form of "bagaregården") translates into "baker's estate".

Close to Bagaregården lie the remains of a medieval church, Härlanda Church Ruins. It was torn down by request from Gustavus I of Sweden.  

Gothenburg
Boroughs of Gothenburg